Nove Zhyttia is a village in Mohyiv-Podilskyi Raion of Vinnytsia Oblast in southern Ukraine, near the Moldian border.

References

Shtetls
Mohyliv-Podilskyi Raion

Villages in Mohyliv-Podilskyi Raion